Brisk may refer to:
 Brest, Belarus (Brest-Litovsk) Brisk (בריסק) is the city's name in Yiddish
 Brisk tradition and Soloveitchik dynasty, a school of Jewish thought originated by the Soloveitchik family of Brest (see also Brisker method)
 Brisk (drink), an iced tea soft drink produced by a joint venture between the Pepsi-Lipton Company and Unilever